St. Paraskevi's Church is a church in Përmet, Gjirokastër County, Albania. It became a Cultural Monument of Albania in 1963.

References

Buildings and structures in Përmet